Steinau can refer to:

Steinau an der Straße, a town in Hesse, Germany
Steinau, Lower Saxony, a town in Lower Saxony, Germany
Steinau an der Oder, the German name for Ścinawa, a town in southwestern Poland
Steinau, the German name for Stonava, a village in the Czech Republic
Two tributaries of the Sieber in Osterode am Harz district in Germany:
Große Steinau
Kleine Steinau
 The Silesian Duchy of Steinau